KZJL (channel 61) is a television station in Houston, Texas, United States, broadcasting the Spanish-language network Estrella TV. It is owned and operated by Estrella Media and is sister to four radio stations. KZJL's studios are located on Bering Drive on the city's southwest side, and its transmitter is located near Missouri City, in unincorporated northeastern Fort Bend County.

History
The station first signed on the air on June 2, 1995, as an affiliate of home shopping network Shop at Home. In 2001, the station was purchased by Liberman Broadcasting (which was renamed Estrella Media in February 2020, following a corporate reorganization of the company under private equity firm HPS Investment Partners, LLC) and became a Spanish-language independent station; on September 14, 2009, KZJL became a charter owned-and-operated station of Liberman's Spanish-language broadcast network Estrella TV.

Technical information

Subchannels
The station's digital signal is multiplexed:

Analog-to-digital conversion
KZJL discontinued regular programming on its analog signal, over UHF channel 61, on June 12, 2009, as part of federally mandated transition from analog to digital television. The station's digital signal remained on its pre-transition UHF channel 44, using PSIP to display KZJL's virtual channel as 61 on digital television receivers, which was among the high band UHF channels (52-69) that were removed from broadcasting use as a result of the transition.

References

External links
Estrella TV official website

Estrella TV affiliates
Television channels and stations established in 1995
1995 establishments in Texas
Spanish-language television stations in Texas
Estrella Media stations
ZJL